Janet Louise Hubert (born January 13, 1956) is an American film and television actress. She is best known for playing the role of the original Vivian Banks on the sitcom The Fresh Prince of Bel-Air from its first season in 1990 until the end of its third season in 1993. Hubert was nominated for an NAACP Image Award for Outstanding Actress in a Comedy Series for her role in 1991. Her performance as Mignon on the digital series King Ester garnered her first Daytime Emmy Award nomination in 2020.

Early life
Hubert was born in Chicago, Illinois and spent her early days growing up on Chicago's South Side. At the age of nine she moved with her family to rural Chicago. She won a scholarship to the Juilliard School in New York City, but did not complete her studies.

Career
After performing in the national tour of Dancin', Hubert made her Broadway debut in 1981, in the ensemble of The First, a short-lived musical about Jackie Robinson. Hubert created the role of Tantomile in the original Broadway production of Cats, and also understudied Grizabella and Demeter. She left Cats in April 1983 to star in the national tour of Sophisticated Ladies, opposite Dee Dee Bridgewater and Gregg Burge. Hubert played Aunt Viv on The Fresh Prince of Bel-Air, the role she is most known for. After she was allegedly fired by the makers of The Fresh Prince, Hubert's character was recast and played by Daphne Maxwell Reid for the remainder of the show's run. At the time, Will Smith, the show's star, said Hubert "brought her problems to work" and wanted to be the star of the show. Hubert said Smith had gotten her fired.

Hubert was featured in a 2002 episode of Friends as Chandler's boss. In 2005, she began playing the recurring role of Lisa Williamson, mother of attorney Evangeline Williamson, on One Life to Live. Her character has made occasional appearances since then. She was featured as Michel Gerard's mother in an episode of the CW show Gilmore Girls. She has made appearances on episodes of All My Children, NYPD Blue, The Bernie Mac Show, and Tyler Perry's House of Payne, among others. In November 2018, it was announced that Hubert had been cast on the daytime soap opera, General Hospital; she made her debut as Yvonne on December 7, 2018.

Hubert appeared in The Fresh Prince of Bel-Air Reunion on HBO Max in November 2020. In a private conversation for the special, she and Smith spoke for the first time since her departure from the show. More information and context was offered regarding the situation and her exit. Hubert discussed issues in her personal life, including her abusive marriage, and revealed she had not been fired from the show as largely believed; she was offered a "bad deal" to return for the fourth season, a deal she turned down. Smith spoke about how he was neither "sensitive" nor "perceptive" to Hubert's situation and was very young and immature at that time. Being a parent now, however, has taught him how to understand what she was dealing with. Smith assured Hubert he wishes he had acted differently and apologized for his actions. In the end, the two appeared to reconcile. Hubert then joined the rest of the guests at the reunion.

Hubert appeared on FX's Pose in Season 3 as a family member of Billy Porter's character, Pray Tell, alongside Jackée Harry and Anna Maria Horsford. In 2022, she appeared on The Ms. Pat Show as the title character's mother-in-law, Jewell.

Personal life
Hubert was married to James Whitten from 1990 to 1994; they had a son, Elijah Isaac Whitten. She has been married to Larry Kraft since 2005. She suffers from osteoporosis and is the ambassador of the National Osteoporosis Foundation.

Filmography

Film

Television

Music videos

Stage

Video games

Awards

References

External links

1956 births
Living people
20th-century American actresses
21st-century American actresses
20th-century African-American women singers
Actresses from Chicago
Juilliard School alumni
African-American actresses
American television actresses
American film actresses
American musical theatre actresses
American soap opera actresses
People from Momence, Illinois
21st-century African-American women
21st-century African-American people